The 101st Division Sustainment Brigade is a sustainment brigade of the United States Army based at Fort Campbell providing logistical support to the 101st Airborne Division. Formerly a separate unit under the command of United States Army Forces Command, it became a division sustainment brigade in 2015 and adopted the wear of the division SSI.

Organization
The 101st Sustainment Brigade was a separate brigade under FORSCOM and became part of the 101st Airborne Division in 2015. This modular sustainment brigade is composed of two battalions and two attached units:
  101st Special Troops Battalion "Steady Eagle"
 Headquarters and Headquarters Company "Angry Dogs"
 9th Theater Gateway
 58th Signal Company "Mandalorians"
 101st Financial Management Support Company "Eagle Paymasters"
 101st Human Resources Company "The Professionals"
 619th Field Feeding Company "Fire Eagles"
  129th Division Sustainment Support Battalion "Hammer Down," part of the 43rd Sustainment Brigade
 Headquarters and Headquarters Detachment
 Alpha Company, (formerly 227th Composite Truck Company)
 Bravo Company, (formerly 584th Ordnance Company)
 Charlie Company, (formerly 74th Composite Truck Company)
 372d Inland Cargo Transportation Company
 613th MCT
 632d MCT
 541st Transportation Company
 594th Transportation Company
Attached units:
 716th Military Police Battalion "Peacekeepers," 16th Military Police Brigade

History
The 101st Airborne Division Support Command (DISCOM) was activated on 1 July 1956 at Fort Campbell as the 101st Airborne Division support group. The support group was composed of the 326th Airborne Medical Company, the 426th Airborne Quartermaster Company, the 101st Parachute Support and Maintenance Company, the Headquarters, Headquarters Detachment and the Division Band.

Organizational changes occurred in April 1957. On 25 April 1957, the 101st Airborne Division Support Group was reorganized and re-designated as Support Group, 101st Airborne Division. The 426th Airborne Quartermaster Company became the 426th Supply and Transportation Company. The 101st Parachute Support and Maintenance Company separated from the group, and the 101st Administration Company and Company B, 313th Army Security Agency Battalion were added to the group. In February 1964, the Support Group was reorganized and re-designated as the 101st Airborne Division Support Command. Subordinate units were the 326th Medical Battalion, the 426th Supply and Transportation Company, the Headquarters and Headquarters Company, the Division Band, the 101st Administration Company and the 101st Quartermaster Company (Air Equipment Support).

In October 1992, the Division Support Command was provisionally reorganized into three support battalions, one main support battalion, the 101st Personnel Service Company, the 101st Finance Battalion, the Headquarters and Headquarters Company and the Division Band. On 16 April 1994, the DISCOM consisted of the Headquarters and Headquarters Company, the 63rd Chemical Company, the 426th Forward Support Battalion, the 526th Forward Support Battalion, the 626th Forward Support Battalion, the 801st Main Support Battalion and the 8th Battalion, 101st Aviation Regiment (AVIM).

11 September 2001 signaled another chapter in the DISCOM history. The 626th Forward Support Battalion, along with elements from the 801st Main Support Battalion, 8th Battalion, 101st Aviation Regiment and DISCOM Headquarters, all deployed to Afghanistan where they supported Task Force Rakkasan during Operation Enduring Freedom. In February 2003, the Division Support Command deployed to the Middle East in support of Operation Iraqi Freedom, providing Combat Service Support to the 101st Airborne Division (Air Assault).

On 16 September 2004, the 101st Airborne Division Support Command was reorganized and re-designated as the 101st Spport Brigade, being officially relieved from the 101st Airborne Division, thus changing their patch from the "Old Abe" of the renown 101st Airborne Division. on 21 April 2005, the unit was redesignated as the 101st Sustainment Brigade. The unit deployed to Iraq in its new capacity in late 2005.

In late 2014, the 101st Sustainment Brigade was deployed to Liberia in support of Joint Forces Command-United Assistance in hindering the spread of the Ebola outbreak.

On 30 July 2015, the 101st Sustainment Brigade was redesignated as the 101st Airborne Division Sustainment Brigade.  Being officially realigned back to the 101st Airborne, they reverted to wearing the "Old Abe" patch.

In 2018, the unit was deployed to Afghanistan.

The unit is informally known as the "LifeLiners".

References

External links
 Official homepage

101
101st Airborne Division
Military units and formations established in 2004